is a Japanese male weightlifter, competing in the 62 kg category and representing Japan at international competitions. He participated at the 2004 Summer Olympics in the 62 kg event. He competed at world championships, most recently at the 2007 World Weightlifting Championships.

Major results

References

External links
 

1979 births
Living people
Japanese male weightlifters
Weightlifters at the 2004 Summer Olympics
Olympic weightlifters of Japan
Sportspeople from Yamanashi Prefecture